Jiwa is a television drama airing every Tuesday in the TV3, starting February 4, 2014.

Cast
Kamal Adli as Jiwa
Remy Ishak as Iskandar
Faizal Hussein as Alif Rizal
Wan Raja as Salleh

References

Malaysian drama television series
2014 Malaysian television series debuts
2014 Malaysian television series endings
TV3 (Malaysia) original programming